James Kendall may refer to:

 James Kendall (politician) (1647–1708), English soldier, Member of Parliament and Governor of Barbados
 James Kendall (chemist) (1889–1978), English chemist
 James Tyldesley Kendall (1916–1991), American chemist and research physicist
 James Kendall (died c. 1874), bandleader, brother of Edward "Ned" Kendall